The 10th edition of the annual Hypo-Meeting took place on May 19 and May 20, 1984 in Götzis, Austria. The track and field competition featured a decathlon (men) and a heptathlon (women) event.

Men's Decathlon

Schedule

May 25

May 26

Records

Results

Women's Heptathlon

Schedule

May 25

May 26

Records

Notes

References
 Statistics
 1984 Year Ranking Decathlon
 1984 details

1984
Hypo-Meeting
Hypo-Meeting
Hypo-Meeting